Unipro  (former names: E.ON Russia, The Fourth Generation Company of the Wholesale Electricity Market or OGK-4) is a Russian power generation company formed by merger of five generation companies. 83.73% of the company is owned by the German energy company Uniper, the rest of the shares are owned by minority shareholders.

History and operations 
Unipro was founded in 2006 with the merger of the following power plants: 
 Surgut-2 Power Station – 5,600 MW, 
 Berezovskaya GRES – 1,550 MW
 Shatura Power Station – 1,500 MW
 Smolenskaya GRES – 630 MW
 Yajvinskaya GRES – 1,016 MW

The installed capacity of all five thermal power plants is about 10,296 MW, which comprises about 5% of the generating capacity of RAO UES.

The output of the Unipro power plants in 2007 was around 54.5 TWh. According to the current investment program, there are plans to increase the original capacity of the power plants by 9.03 GW to more than 11 GW in 2011 with spending for these purposes by US$2.89 billion.

References

External links

 

Electric power companies of Russia
Russian companies established in 2005
Companies listed on the Moscow Exchange
Uniper
Companies based in Khanty-Mansi Autonomous Okrug
Russian brands
Energy companies established in 2005